Rhipidoherpiidae is a family of solenogaster, a kind of shell-less, worm-like, marine mollusk.

Genera
 Rhipidoherpia Salvini-Plawen, 1978
 Thieleherpia Salvini-Plawen, 2004

References

 Salvini-Plawen L v. (1978). Antarktische und subantarktische Solenogastres (eine Monographie: 1898–1974). Zoologica (Stuttgart) 128: 1-305
 García-Álvarez O. & Salvini-Plawen L.v. (2007). Species and diagnosis of the families and genera of Solenogastres (Mollusca). Iberus 25(2): 73-143

Solenogastres